Ashok Nagar is a locality in Hyderabad, Telangana, India.  The locality is well-known for its concentration of coaching centers catering to students aspiring for Government jobs.

Commercial area
There are many shopping malls catering to all needs. It is close to Hussain sagar lake and the popular Indira Park.
The suburb is well known for coaching institutes. Around 25,000–30,000 students get trained every year for UPSC, APPSC, TSPSC, SSC and other well known government exams. After Karol bagh and Mukherjee nagar (of Delhi), Ashok nagar of Hyderabad is the most preferred destination for UPSC Civil Services coaching.

Transport
Ashok Nagar is well-connected by the TSRTC buses which ply on two routes covering most of the area. The closest MMTS train station is Vidyanagar station.

References

Neighbourhoods in Hyderabad, India

Hospitals.
ivf treatment in hyderabad